Spain is scheduled to compete at the 2024 Summer Olympics in Paris from 26 July to 11 August 2024. Spanish athletes have appeared in every edition of the Summer Olympic Games from 1920 onwards, except for two occasions: the 1936 Summer Olympics in Nazi Germany because of the nation's civil war and the 1956 Summer Olympics in Melbourne as a protest against the Soviet invasion of Hungary.

Competitors
The following is the provisional list of number of competitors in the Games.

Athletics

Spanish track and field athletes achieved the entry standards for Paris 2024, either by passing the direct qualifying mark (or time for track and road races) or by world ranking, in the following events (a maximum of 3 athletes each):

Track and road events

Achieved qualifying marks
 Men's marathon – Ayad Lamdassem, Abdelaziz Merzoughi, Tariku Novales
 Women's marathon – Marta Galimany, Meritxell Soler

Gymnastics

Rhythmic
Spain entered a squad of rhythmic gymnasts to compete in the group all-around competition, following the nation's successful third-place finish in the qualifying round at the 2022 World Championships in Sofia, Bulgaria.

Shooting

Spanish shooters achieved quota places for the following events based on their results at the 2022 and 2023 ISSF World Championships, 2022, 2023, and 2024 European Championships, 2023 European Games, and 2024 ISSF World Olympic Qualification Tournament, if they obtained a minimum qualifying score (MQS) from 14 August 2022 to 9 June 2024.

References

Olympics
2024
Nations at the 2024 Summer Olympics